German submarine U-801 was a Type IXC/40 U-boat built for Nazi Germany's Kriegsmarine during World War II.

U-801 was ordered on 7 December 1940 from DeSchiMAG Seebeckwerft in Geestemünde under the yard number 359. Her keel was laid down on 30 September 1941 and after eleven months of construction the U-boat was launched the following year on 31 October 1942. About six months later she was commissioned into service under the command of Kapitänleutnant Hans-Joachim Brans (Crew 35) in the 4th U-boat Flotilla.

Design
German Type IXC/40 submarines were slightly larger than the original Type IXCs. U-801 had a displacement of  when at the surface and  while submerged. She had two shafts and two  propellers.

U-801 was fitted with six  torpedo tubes (four fitted at the bow and two at the stern), 22 torpedoes, one  SK C/32 naval gun, 180 rounds, and a  SK C/30 as well as a  C/30 anti-aircraft gun. The boat had a complement of forty-eight.

Service history
Via Kristiansand and Stavanger, the U-boats reached Bergen two days later. Leaving Bergen the next week, U-801 joined wolfpack Coronel operating against convoy ONS 24 in the North Atlantic on 2 December 1943. For the rest of the month she patrolled in her assigned operation area and joined two more wolf-packs, Coronel 2 and Borkum until technical problems forced her to make for port. U-801 reached Lorient on 8 January 1944.

Her second patrol would have led her into the Indian Ocean as part of Monsun group, however U-801 was detected by a submarine hunter group three weeks into her journey. The submarine surfaced on the evening of March 16th only to be attacked by aircraft from the aircraft carrier . The U-boat dived and managed to evade the hunters until the early hours of the March 17th, when the U-801 skipper erred and sent a radio message.  ran down the bearing of the transmission, and she and  methodically boxed in the U-801, forcing her to surface. On the surface, she was immediately attacked by Corry. Nine crew members lost their lives in the attack.  The crew abandoned and scuttled their boat. The remaining crew were picked up by Corry and later transferred to Block Island. The 47 survivors were brought to Norfolk, Virginia and spent the rest of the war in captivity.

Wolfpacks
U-801 took part in four wolfpacks, namely:
 Coronel (4 – 8 December 1943)
 Coronel 2 (8 – 14 December 1943)
 Coronel 3 (14 – 17 December 1943)
 Borkum (18 December 1943 – 3 January 1944)

References

Bibliography

External links

World War II submarines of Germany
German Type IX submarines
1942 ships
U-boats commissioned in 1943
U-boats scuttled in 1944
World War II shipwrecks in the Atlantic Ocean
Ships built in Bremen (state)
U-boats sunk by US aircraft
U-boats sunk by US warships
Maritime incidents in March 1944